Stokes is a census-designated place in Pitt County, North Carolina, United States. The CDP is a part of the Greenville Metropolitan Area in North Carolina's Inner Banks region.

It is located 10 miles northeast of Greenville along North Carolina Highway 30.

History

The Thomas Sheppard Farm was listed on the National Register of Historic Places in 2000.
John Henry Roberson, Jr., a direct descendant of the founders of Robersonville, owned his own farm south of Robersonville, and was involved in many civic affairs with his brothers David Roberson and Grover H. Roberson. Grover H. Roberson left the Stokes area in early 1938 to join the U.S. Navy. Grover saw action at the Battle of Anzio, in Italy.  After the Battle of Anzio, Grover was in the company of a group of other naval officers and had a special audience with Pope Pius XIV at the Vatican in Rome, Italy. After discharge from the U.S. Navy,  Grover moved to South Thomaston, Maine.  David Roberson successfully operated the Robuck family farm, in the Robersonville/Stokes area for most of his life.
reference:  History of Martin and Pitt Counties.

Education
Stokes' local school is Stokes Elementary School, serving grades pre-K through 8th; North Pitt High School serves grades 9-12.

Utilities
Stokes Regional Water Company serves local water needs; Stokes & Congleton Gas Co. is the local Propane(LP) supplier, www.stokescongleton.com ; Embarq is the local telephone and ADSL company; and GUC provides electricity.

Sources 

Chronicles of Pitt County, Volume I. Pitt County Historical Society, Elizabeth Copeland, Editor, 1982, reprinted 2003.
Chronicles of Pitt County, Volume II. Pitt County Historical Society, Sandra Hunsucker, Executive Editor, 2005.
History of Pitt and Martin Counties.  
History of the Roberson Family of Martin County.

Census-designated places in North Carolina
Census-designated places in Pitt County, North Carolina
Greenville, North Carolina metropolitan area